Top End Wedding is a 2019 Australian romantic comedy film directed by Wayne Blair, starring Miranda Tapsell and Gwilym Lee. Tapsell also co-wrote the film and served as the executive producer.

The film tells the story of Lauren, a lawyer planning to wed her fiancé in her hometown, only to discover that her mother has abruptly left the family.

Plot
In 1976, a young Daphne "Daffy" Ford escapes an arranged marriage in her homeland on the Tiwi Islands. While being chased by her relatives, she flees the island on a speedboat.

In the present day, Daffy's daughter, Lauren, works as a lawyer in Adelaide and has recently been promoted. Her boyfriend, Ned, proposes to her, suggesting a quick wedding; without telling her that he has just quit his job, also as a lawyer. Lauren's workaholic boss, Ms. Hampton, gives Lauren 10 days off for the wedding and honeymoon, an offer which Lauren accepts. They decide to quickly organise a wedding in Lauren's hometown of Darwin.

After arriving in Darwin, Lauren discovers that her mother has abandoned her father, Trevor, and that she is nowhere to be found. Lauren decides that she cannot marry without her mother present, and Ned takes her on a road trip to find her. Meanwhile, Lauren calls Ms. Hampton to come to Darwin and help plan the wedding in her absence.

Lauren and Ned follow traces left by Daffy but narrowly miss her at every turn. Lauren explains to Ned that her mother had always been evasive in talking about her past and has never taught her the [Tiwi language]; Lauren expresses shame and embarrassment in not knowing anything about her own heritage and culture. After meeting up with her aunt and talking to her, Lauren realises that her mother has returned to the Tiwi Islands.

While Ms. Hampton plans the wedding with Lauren's friends, she talks to Trevor, who has been depressed since Daffy has left him. He discusses his marriage with Ms. Hampton, and she in turn confides her former engagement to a man many years before. After the breakdown of that relationship, she has focused mostly on her work.

On their way to the Tiwi Islands, Lauren discovers that Ned had quit his job without telling her. This leads to an argument where they both claim that they are not being listened to. Lauren cancels the wedding and continues to the Tiwi Islands alone.

There, Lauren meets her extended family for the first time and is greeted with warmth. She finds her mother outside of a church and witnesses Daffy reuniting and reconciling with her parents; Lauren, in turn, meets her grandparents for the first time. Later, she informs Daffy of her engagement, but is afraid that she will regret her marriage just as her mother did. Conversely, Daffy tells her that she never regretted her marriage but regrets being estranged from her family. She tells Lauren that Ned is a good man and encourages her to marry him. Lauren calls Ned while he is at the airport; he initially ignores her calls, but Ms. Hampton appears and forces him to answer his phone. He and Lauren reconcile and she tells him that they must marry on the Tiwi Islands. Ned persuades Ms. Hampton to skip a day at work and come to the wedding, as he is grateful for her continuous support of Lauren and Trevor.

Ned rushes back to Trevor's house and encourages him to come to his daughter's wedding, despite his dishevelled state. Running late to the wedding, the two take the speedboat (the same one Daffy escaped on many years earlier) to the Tiwi Islands. Lauren and Ned reunite and are happily married in front of their family and friends; Ned tells Lauren that he intends to make a career change and become a chef. Trevor and Daffy reconcile and affirm their love for one another.

Cast
Miranda Tapsell as Lauren
Gwilym Lee as Ned
Kerry Fox as Ms. Hampton
Shari Sebbens as Ronelle
Ursula Yovich as Daphne "Daffy" Ford
Brooklyn Doomadgee as Young Daffy
Huw Higginson as Trevor Ford
Travis Jeffery as young Trevor Ford
Rob Collins as Father Isaac
Matt Crook as Robbie
Taylor Wiese as Alex
Tracy Mann as Annie
Tierney White as Receptionist

Reception
The website's critics consensus reads: "Familiar in form but winsome in its execution, Top End Wedding takes audiences on a romantic road trip with an appealing view."

Accolades

References

External links
 
Top End Wedding at Rotten Tomatoes

Australian romantic comedy films
Films set in Australia
2019 romantic comedy films
Films about Aboriginal Australians
Films directed by Wayne Blair
2019 films
2010s English-language films
Films set in the Northern Territory